Adam Václavík (born 18 February 1994) is a Czech biathlete. He has competed in the Biathlon World Cup.

References

1994 births
Living people
Czech male biathletes
People from Jilemnice
Biathletes at the 2018 Winter Olympics
Biathletes at the 2022 Winter Olympics
Olympic biathletes of the Czech Republic
Biathletes at the 2012 Winter Youth Olympics
Universiade bronze medalists for the Czech Republic
Universiade medalists in biathlon
Competitors at the 2019 Winter Universiade
Sportspeople from the Liberec Region